Dhol (English: 'Drum') is a 2007 Indian Hindi-language comedy thriller film directed by Priyadarshan and produced under the Percept Picture Company. A remake of the 1990 Malayalam film In Harihar Nagar written by Siddique-Lal which was already remade in Hindi in 1992 as Parda Hai Parda starring Chunky Pandey, the film stars Tusshar Kapoor, Sharman Joshi, Kunal Khemu, Rajpal Yadav, Tanushree Dutta and Om Puri in lead roles while Arbaaz Khan, Abhimanyu Singh, Payal Rohatgi, Murli Sharma, Asrani and Tiku Talsania are featured in supporting yet crucial roles. Released on 21 September 2007, it received mixed response from critics upon release.

Plot
Sameer "Sam" Arya, Pankaj "Pakya" Tiwari, Gautam "Goti" Sisodia and Martand "Maru" Dhamdere  are roommates in Pune who are bound together by their ambition to make it big in life with the least effort possible. Each one tries his hand at finding a shortcut to success but ends up being in even deeper trouble. Things get worse when the four decide to take some desperate measures to end their misery once and for all. They take loans from Martand’s maternal uncle  at very high interest so he always beats up Martand.

They believe that the only way to get rich without working hard is to marry a wealthy girl. As luck would have it, a rich girl Ritu  arrives in their neighborhood with her grandparents. All four set out with their individual plans to marry her but end up discovering a shocking truth. Ritu came to the city to find out about her brother Rahul's killers.

All four of them try to impress Ritu but meanwhile, they discover that Rahul died along with his friend Jaishankar "Jai" Yadav. They try hard and finally Pankaj is decided to marry Ritu. Soon before marriage, Ritu finds the secret that Rahul and Jai were in contact with a notorious gang leader Zikomo. Also, Ritu finds that the four were bluffing all time just to impress her and so she starts avoiding them. One day Zikomo finds them and kidnaps Ritu and her grandparents. He reveals himself to be the true killer and he confesses about killing Rahul and Jai. He asks for them to hand over a drum if they wanted to see him alive, but Ritu's family members do not know about any drum. A fight ensues and Zikomo is killed in a self-explosion in the end. Ritu hands over the drum and the four of them find it filled with money, realizing that Zikomo was after the money and not the drum. They run behind Ritu's car after she leaves, as the film ends.

Cast
 Tusshar Kapoor as Sameer "Sam" Arya
 Sharman Joshi as Pankaj "Pakya" Tiwari Jayawardene 
 Kunal Khemu as Gautam "Goti" Sisodia 
 Rajpal Yadav as Martand "Maru" Dhamdhere
 Tanushree Dutta as Ritu Tripathi
 Om Puri as Satyadev Tripathi, Ritu’s Grandfather
 Arbaaz Khan as Jaishankar "Jai" Yadav
 Murli Sharma as Zikomo Singh
 Payal Rohatgi as Sophie Strauss; Jai's Fiance 
 Abhimanyu Singh as Rahul Tripathi, Ritu's brother
 Baby Farida as Elizabeth Tripathi, Ritu's grandmother
 Asrani as Sunil Nahata, Pankaj's brother in-law
 Tiku Talsania as Inspector Subhash Dongre (Mama), Martand's Uncle
 Tareena Patel as Kanika
 Rasika Joshi as Landlady

Soundtrack

Track listing

Critical response
Taran Adarsh of Bollywood Hungama gave the film 3 stars out of 5, writing ″On the whole, DHOL is a decent entertainer that has some really funny comic moments. At the box-office, the Priyadarshan brand should ensure impressive footfalls at cineplexes despite the dull period and coupled with its moderate pricing, DHOL should find a place in the director's successful films.″ Syed Firdaus Ashraf of Rediff.com gave the film 2.5 stars out of 5 calling it ″funny in parts.″

Rajeev Masand gave the film 1 star out of 5, writing ″I’m going with one out of five and a suggestion to stay far, far away from Priyadarshan’s Dhol. The one star is for the smattering of genuine comedy you’re likely to find here, the rest is just indifferent film-making, an insult to your intelligence. You know, every time I walk out of the cinema after watching a Priyadarshan film, I feel like he can’t make a film worse than this. And every single time, he surprises me by surpassing his previous achievement.″

References

External links
 

2007 films
2000s Hindi-language films
2000s comedy thriller films
Hindi remakes of Malayalam films
Films directed by Priyadarshan
Films featuring songs by Pritam
Indian comedy thriller films
Films about murder
2007 comedy films
 Indian buddy films